Khairpur, aka Khairpur Gambo or Khair, is a village and deh in Tando Bago taluka of Badin District, Sindh. As of 2017, it has a population of 8,176, in 1,500 households. It is the seat of a tapedar circle, which also includes the villages of Buhri, Chubandi, Dhoro Kaknoro, Girathri, Khanah, Phule, Miyan Sultan Ahmed, Jalal Legari and Piror. Khairpur is also the seat of a Union Council, which has a total population of 41,119.

References

Populated places in Badin District